Atria Oyj is a Finnish food industry company. Atria's roots date from 1903, when a co-operative for livestock sales was founded. Atria is listed on the Helsinki stock exchange, NASDAQ OMX Helsinki.

Atria's net sales in 2013 were EUR 1,411 million and it employed an average of 4,669 people. The group is divided into four business areas, which are Atria Finland, Atria Scandinavia, Atria Russia and Atria Baltic. Atria's customers are retailers, food service, the food industry, and its own fast food concept.

History 
The company is the result of the merger of Lihapolar Oy and Itikka Lihabotnia Oy in 1990.

History of Lihapolar Oy
 1903 Kuopion Karjanmyyntiosuus kunta (Kuopio livestock sales cooperative, KKO) is founded. 
 1910 KKO buys a sausage factory, and the first Atria sausages are produced.
 1938 Renamed to Savo-Karjalan Osuusteurastamo (Savo-Karelia Cooperative Slaughterhouse, SKO).
 1956 Renamed Lihakunta (Meat cooperative). Business expands to include manufacturing and sales.
 1972 Merger of Lihakunta and Karjapohjola. Operations expand to northern Finland.
 1975 Lihakunta buys Pohjolan Liha Oy.
 1981 Lihakunta acquires the meat division of Osuustukkukauppa (OTK).
 1988 Lihapolar Oy is founded.  It takes care of all production operations, sales and marketing.

History of Itikka Lihabotnia Oy
 1914 Itikka founded in Seinäjoki. 
 1917 Itikka builds a sausage factory.
 1937 First Atria ready meals produced.
 1975 Itikka buys Maan Liha Oy.
 1981 Itikka acquires a share of Osuustukkukauppa (OTK's) meat division.
 1985 Itikka buys OK-Liha Oy.
 1988 Itikka Liha-botnia Oy is founded, into which all manufacturing and commercial activities are transferred.

History of merged company
 1990 Merger of Lihapolar Oy and Itikka Lihabotnia Oy.
 1991 Itikka-Lihapolar begins operations. The company acquiries Osuuskunta Pohjanmaan Liha (Ostrobothnia Cooperative Meat) and lists on the stock exchange.
 1994 Atria is adopted as the company's name
 1992–1996 Operations are consolidated in three offices.
 1996 Nurmo ready-food production intensifies.
 1999 Forssalainen Liha ja Säilyke Oy is acquired.

Business areas

Atria Finland 
Atria Finland's leading brand is Atria. Atria is the market leader in several product groups in Finland. By the company's own estimate, its total market share in grocery stores in about 27%.

Atria Scandinavia 
Atria Scandinavia's leading brand in Sweden is Sibylla, which is also Atria's most international brand. In Denmark, the best known brand is 3-Stjernet. In Sweden, Atria has the second largest market share in sausages and cold cuts. In Denmark, it is the market leader.

Atria Russia 
Atria Russia's brands are Pit-Product and CampoMos. The Pit-Product-brand is the market leader in its product group in St Petersburg grocery stores, at about 20%. CampoMos market share in Moscow and St Petersburg is low.

Atria Baltic 
Atria Baltic's products are manufactured and marketed primarily in Estonia. The brands are Maks & Moorits, VK ja Wõro. Atria's market share in cold cuts and sausages is nationally around 15%.

Administration and management 
Responsibility for the administration and operations of Atria Group lies with the governing bodies of the parent, Atria Plc. These are the General Meeting, Supervisory Board, Board of Directors and CEO.

Board of directors 
 Seppo Paavola, Chairman
 Timo Komulainen, Deputy Chairman
 Esa Kaarto
 Kjell-Göran Paxal
 Jyrki Rantsi
 Maisa Romanainen
 Harri Sivula

External links

References 

Food and drink companies of Finland